Todd Robert Pearson  (born 25 November 1977) is an Australian swimming champion, who was born in Geraldton, Western Australia. He started swimming on the advice of a doctor treating his asthma. Pearson was vice captain of Hale School in 1994 where he spent time in Faulkner House and St George House. He was an Australian Institute of Sport scholarship holder.

He was no stranger to the Olympic Games. After swimming the heat of the 4×100-metre freestyle relay at the 2000 Summer Olympics in Sydney, Pearson was a spectator for the final, when the Australians set a world record by beating the US team for the first time in Olympic history. He went on to swim in the final of the 4×200-metre freestyle with Ian Thorpe, Michael Klim and Bill Kirby. The Aussies led from start to finish, setting another world record and achieving every child's dream of winning gold for Australia. Pearson was awarded the Order of Australia medal for contribution to sport for this effort.  After Sydney in 2000, Pearson won gold medals at the 2002 Pan Pacific Swimming Championships and the 2002 Commonwealth Games. He was also co-captain of the Australian swimming team in 2001. Despite swimming more than 50 kilometres a week, Pearson found time to complete a bachelor of commerce degree with a major in accounting and has worked for a multinational accounting firm.

Pearson later represented Australia in the 4×200-metre freestyle relay in the 2004 Summer Olympics in Athens, winning a silver medal.

See also 
 List of Olympic medalists in swimming (men)

References

External links
 Profile
 

1977 births
Living people
People educated at Hale School
Australian male freestyle swimmers
Olympic swimmers of Australia
Swimmers at the 2004 Summer Olympics
Swimmers at the 2000 Summer Olympics
Olympic gold medalists for Australia
Olympic silver medalists for Australia
Sportsmen from Western Australia
Sportspeople from Geraldton
World record setters in swimming
World Aquatics Championships medalists in swimming
Australian Institute of Sport swimmers
Medalists at the FINA World Swimming Championships (25 m)
Medalists at the 2004 Summer Olympics
Medalists at the 2000 Summer Olympics
Olympic gold medalists in swimming
Olympic silver medalists in swimming
Commonwealth Games medallists in swimming
Commonwealth Games gold medallists for Australia
Goodwill Games medalists in swimming
Swimmers at the 2002 Commonwealth Games
Recipients of the Medal of the Order of Australia
Competitors at the 2001 Goodwill Games
21st-century Australian people
20th-century Australian people
Medallists at the 2002 Commonwealth Games